Kim Jan-di (born 24 July 1995) is a South Korean taekwondo practitioner. 

She won a bronze medal in welterweight at the 2017 World Taekwondo Championships, after being defeated by Nur Tatar in the semifinal. She won a bronze medal at the 2018 Asian Taekwondo Championships, and a silver medal at the 2018 Asian Games.

References

1995 births
Living people
South Korean female taekwondo practitioners
Taekwondo practitioners at the 2018 Asian Games
Asian Games medalists in taekwondo
Medalists at the 2018 Asian Games
Asian Games silver medalists for South Korea
World Taekwondo Championships medalists
Asian Taekwondo Championships medalists
21st-century South Korean women